Neoeromene straminella is a moth in the family Crambidae. It was described by Philipp Christoph Zeller in 1877. It is found in Brazil.

The wingspan is 14–15 mm. The ground colour of the forewings is pale yellowish orange.

References

Diptychophorini
Moths described in 1877